Truman Bethurum (August 21, 1898 – May 21, 1969) was one of the well known 1950s UFO or alien "contactees"- individuals who claimed to have spoken with people from other inhabited planets and entered or ridden in their spacecraft.
Bethurum was born in Gavilin, California, and in the early 1950s worked as a truck driver and a mechanic on a desert road-building crew. He later became a self-proclaimed spiritual advisor. In 1953, Bethurum first published magazine and newspaper (Redondo Beach  Daily Breeze, September 25, 1953) accounts of being contacted on eleven separate occasions beginning in July, 1952 by the humanoid crew of a landed space ship near Mormon Mesa in the Mojave Desert of southern Nevada, and repeatedly conversing with its beautiful and voluptuous female captain, Aura Rhanes. Bethurum claimed the saucer and its crew, who spoke colloquial English, came from "the planet Clarion", which was allegedly on the other side of the Sun and thus  could not be seen from the Earth. Bethurum's 1954 book, Aboard a Flying Saucer, gave many details of his suffering at the hands of skeptics and wrote a great deal about the purported Captain Rhanes, Clarion and its people.

Serious UFO researchers and investigators dismissed Bethurum and the other 1950s contactees as charlatans and con-artists. The majority of contactees of this period became (or already were) leaders in new paradigm movements to, in their view, inform and educate people about extraterrestrial intelligent life; in addition to Bethurum, some of the better-known contactees of the 1950s included George Adamski, Daniel Fry, George Van Tassel, Gabriel Green, Orfeo Angelucci and George King. Bethurum made it known that the space people had asked him to consider creating a place of learning for those who were interested in considering the possibility of extraterrestrial intelligent life, with Bethurum as facilitator. The Sanctuary of Thought, a philosophical group, was subsequently created near Prescott, Arizona. Bethurum claimed to possess physical evidence of extraterrestrial existence (which he never produced) such as unique items given to him by Captain Aura Rhanes.

Some of Bethurum's later books include The Voice of the Planet Clarion (1957),  Facing Reality (1958), and The People of the Planet Clarion (1970), published after his death in Landers, California in 1969. The first 44 pages of the posthumous book are an autobiography of Bethurum covering his life up to 1953. Artist Columba Krebs, who assisted Bethurum in writing three of his books, wrote the afterword.
According to Krebs, Bethurum was so obsessed with Captain Rhanes, he hired a secretary who  physically resembled his description of the sexy alien.

Bethurum's second wife, Mary, divorced him in 1955, citing jealousy over Captain Aura Rhanes in the divorce petition. Bethurum often remarked in his later lectures that his wife divorced him due to jealousy over the beautiful Captain. In 1960, Bethurum remarried a third time, the wedding taking place at George Van Tassel's annual Giant Rock Spacecraft Convention near Landers.

See also
 When Prophecy Fails (a book about Dorothy Martin who claimed to have received prophetic messages from the planet Clarion)

References

Further reading
 Lewis, James R., editor, UFOs and Popular Culture, Santa Barbara, CA: ABC-CLIO, Inc., 2000. .
 Story, Ronald L., editor, The Encyclopedia of Extraterrestrial Encounters, NY, NY: New American Library, 2001. .
 Bethurum, Truman, Messages from the People of the Planet Clarion, New Brunswick, NJ: Inner Light Publications, 1995.  . A currently available reprint of Bethurum's last book.

External links 
 Overview of 1950s Contactees
 Bethurum scrapbook
 Long John Nebel's radio interviews with 1950s contactees
 Bethurum in Weird Las Vegas and Nevada

UFO religions
Contactees
1898 births
1969 deaths